Thore Tillman (9 August 1915 – 2004) was a Swedish long-distance runner. He won national titles in the 10000 m (1938, 1939, 1944 and 1946) and 8 km cross country (1941) and held national records over 5000 m (1939) and 10,000 m. He placed fifth in the 10000 m at the 1938 European Championships and failed to finish in 1946.

References

Swedish male long-distance runners
1915 births
2004 deaths